The East Machias River is a river in Washington County, Maine. The river mouth is on the border between the towns of East Machias and Machiasport.

See also
List of rivers of Maine

References

Sources

Maine Streamflow Data from the USGS
Maine Watershed Data From Environmental Protection Agency

Rivers of Washington County, Maine
Machias, Maine
Rivers of Maine